Leydig cells, also known as interstitial cells of the testes and interstitial cells of Leydig, are found adjacent to the seminiferous tubules in the testicle and produce testosterone in the presence of luteinizing hormone (LH). They are polyhedral in shape and have a large, prominent nucleus, an eosinophilic cytoplasm, and numerous lipid-filled vesicles.

Structure
The mammalian Leydig cell is a polyhedral epithelioid cell with a single eccentrically located ovoid nucleus. The nucleus contains one to three prominent nucleoli and large amounts of dark-staining peripheral heterochromatin. The acidophilic cytoplasm usually contains numerous membrane-bound lipid droplets and large amounts of smooth endoplasmic reticulum (SER). Besides the abundance of SER with scattered patches of rough endoplasmic reticulum, several mitochondria are also prominent within the cytoplasm. Reinke crystals have lipofuscin pigment and rod-shaped crystal-like structures 3 to 20 micrometres in diameter. 

Adult-type Leydig cells differentiate in the post-natal testis and are dormant until puberty. They are preceded in the testis by a population of fetal-type Leydig cells from the 8th to the 20th week of gestation, which produce enough testosterone for masculinisation of a male fetus.

Androgen production
Leydig cells release a class of hormones called androgens (19-carbon steroids). They secrete testosterone, androstenedione and dehydroepiandrosterone (DHEA), when stimulated by the luteinizing hormone (LH), which is released from the anterior pituitary in response to gonadotropin releasing hormone which in turn is released by the hypothalamus. 

LH binds to its receptor (LHCGR) which is a G-protein coupled receptor and consequently increases the production of cAMP. cAMP, in turn through protein kinase A activation, stimulates cholesterol translocation from intracellular sources (primarily the plasma membrane and intracellular stores) to the mitochondria, firstly to the outer mitochondrial membrane and then cholesterol needs to be translocated to the inner mitochondrial membrane by steroidogenic acute regulatory protein, which is the rate-limiting step in steroid biosynthesis. This is followed by pregnenolone formation from the translocated cholesterol via the cholesterol side-chain cleavage enzyme, which is found in the inner mitochondrial membrane, eventually leading to testosterone synthesis and secretion by Leydig cells.

In rats, prolactin (PRL) increases the response of Leydig cells to LH by increasing the number of LH receptors expressed on Leydig cells.

Clinical significance

Leydig cells may grow uncontrollably and form a Leydig cell tumour. These may be hormonally active, i.e. secrete testosterone. The function of Reinke crystals is unknown, but they appear in the case of Leydig cell tumours. They are found in less than half of all Leydig cell tumors, but they serve to clinch the diagnosis of a Leydig cell tumor. No other interstitial cell within the testes has a nucleus or cytoplasm with these characteristics, making identification relatively easy.

While any age is susceptible to a Leydig cell tumour, Leydig cell tumours are more common in people aged 5 to 10 and 30 to 35. A Leydig cell tumour in a child usually causes precocious puberty. About 10% of boys with the tumour have gynecomastia. Although a Leydig cell tumour is always benign in children, it is malignant in 10% to 15% of adults. It is the most common testicular cancer of non-germ cell origin. 

Sonography may be used to identify cystic areas, but it is unable to tell benign tumours apart from malignant tumours.

Adrenomyeloneuropathy is another example of a disease affecting the Leydig cell. In this case, a person's testosterone may fall despite higher-than-normal levels of LH and follicle-stimulating hormone (FSH).

Etymology
Leydig cells are named after the German anatomist Franz Leydig, who discovered them in 1850.

Additional images

See also
 Sertoli cell
 Sertoli-Leydig cell tumour
List of human cell types derived from the germ layers

References

External links

Reproductive Physiology
Diagram at umassmed.edu

Steroid hormone secreting cells
Animal reproductive system
Human cells
Scrotum